Aldridge H. Vann House is a historic home located at 115 North Main Street in Franklinton, Franklin County, North Carolina.  It was built in 1917–1918, and is a two-story, 6,000 square foot asymmetrical "H"-shaped Classical Revival style poured concrete dwelling faced with tan brick.  The house features a green, Spanish tile roof and a central entry portico.  It was built by Aldridge H. Vann, son of Samuel C. Vann, founder of the local Sterling Cotton Mill.  The grounds were designed by the nursery firm of Thomas Meehan & Sons, Inc. of Philadelphia.

It was listed on the National Register of Historic Places in 2008.

References

Houses on the National Register of Historic Places in North Carolina
Neoclassical architecture in North Carolina
Houses completed in 1918
Houses in Franklin County, North Carolina
National Register of Historic Places in Franklin County, North Carolina